Preptotheria is a superorder of placental mammals proposed by McKenna & Bell in their classification of mammals.

Classification

The Linnean taxonomy of Preptotheria according to the scheme of McKenna & Bell (1997):

Cohort Placentalia

Magnorder Xenarthra
Order Cingulata
Order Pilosa: Sloths and anteaters

Magnorder Epitheria
Superorder †Leptictida
Superorder Preptotheria
Grandorder Anagalida
Mirorder Macroscelidea
Mirorder Duplicidentata
Order †Mimotonida
Order Lagomorpha
Mirorder Simplicidentata
Order †Mixodontia
Order Rodentia
Grandorder Ferae
Order Cimolesta (including Pholidota)
Order †Creodonta
Order Carnivora
Grandorder Lipotyphla
Order Chrysochloridea
Order Erinaceomorpha
Order Soricomorpha
Grandorder Archonta
Order Chiroptera
Order Primates (including Dermoptera as family Galeopithecidae)
Order Scandentia
Grandorder Ungulata
Order Tubulidentata
Order †Dinocerata
Mirorder Eparctocyona
Order †Procreodi
Order †Condylarthra
Order †Arctostylopida
Order Cete
Order Artiodactyla
Mirorder †Meridiungulata
Order †Litopterna
Order †Notoungulata
Order †Astrapotheria
Order †Xenungulata
Order †Pyrotheria
Mirorder Altungulata
Order Perissodactyla
Order Uranotheria or Paenungulata

References

Obsolete mammal taxa